This is a list of islands of Singapore. Massive land reclamation works over the past centuries has merged many of Singapore's former islands and islets and has created a few larger ones. At present, Singapore has about 63 islands, with 3 being inhabited, including the main constituent Singapore Island, with 7 of them – including those in the Western Water Catchment as they are in the SAFTI live firing area – belonging to the Singapore Armed Forces (SAF).

List of islands

For civilian use

For military use

Artificial islands

Former islands

References

External Link 

 The Islands That Made Us: The Forgotten Islands - A documentary about Singapore's islands, produced by Channel News Asia in 2019.
 Singapore Archipelago - A docuseries about the history of Singapore's islands, produced by Sitting In Pictures in 2021, available on meWatch.

 
Singapore
Islands